Megan Shackleton (born 21 March 1999) is a British Paralympic table tennis player. She won bronze in the Women's Team – Class 4–5 at the 2020 Summer Paralympics in Tokyo with Sue Bailey. She is also a World bronze medallist and a double European bronze medallist.

Shackleton was once a competitive swimmer and focused on participating in the Olympics. However, she had a spinal fracture in a machinery-related accident at the age of nine, which left her reliant on a wheelchair. In 2011, aged 12, she began playing para table tennis after visiting an open public sporting event in Leeds and trying out the sport. Two years later, she joined the GB para table tennis team.

References

External links
 

1999 births
Living people
Sportspeople from Sheffield
English female table tennis players
Paralympic table tennis players of Great Britain
Paralympic bronze medalists for Great Britain
Paralympic medalists in table tennis
Table tennis players at the 2020 Summer Paralympics
Medalists at the 2020 Summer Paralympics